Pentalepis is a genus of flowering plants in the family Asteraceae which is endemic to Australia and found only in the Northern Territory and Western Australia.

The genus was first described by Ferdinand von Mueller in 1863.

Etymology
The genus name, Pentalepis, comes from the Greek for "five" (penta) and "scale" (lepis), and refers to the single whorl of five bracts that surrounds the inflorescence.

Species
There are 6 accepted species:
Pentalepis ecliptoides F.Muell.
Pentalepis grandis E.W.Cross
Pentalepis kakaduensis E.W.Cross
Pentalepis linearifolia Orchard
Pentalepis trichodesmoides F.Muell.
Pentalepis walcottii E.W.Cross

References

External links
Pentalepis occurrence data from the Australasian Virtual Herbarium

Heliantheae
Taxa named by Ferdinand von Mueller
Plants described in 1863
Asteraceae genera